Olga Lidia Cepero (born 4 February 1975 in Santiago de Cuba) is a retired Cuban triple jumper.

Her personal best jump is 14.43 metres, achieved in February 1998 in Havana.

Achievements

References

1975 births
Living people
Cuban female triple jumpers
Universiade medalists in athletics (track and field)
Central American and Caribbean Games bronze medalists for Cuba
Competitors at the 1998 Central American and Caribbean Games
Universiade silver medalists for Cuba
Central American and Caribbean Games medalists in athletics
Competitors at the 1999 Summer Universiade
Medalists at the 1997 Summer Universiade